Dream of the Rhine is a 1933 German comedy film directed by Herbert Selpin and starring Eduard Wesener, Käthe Haack, and Hugo Fischer-Köppe. It was shot at the Johannisthal Studios in Berlin and on location in the Rhineland.

Synopsis
After several decades away a wealthy German American decides to return to his homeland and take his Americanised daughter along with him.

Cast
 Gay Christie as Mary Steinweg, Tochter
 Eduard Wesener as Hein Fries
 Peter Erkelenz as Apotheker Filsen
 Käthe Haack as Grete, Dellhausens Frau
 F.W. Schröder-Schrom as Jupp Steinweg
 Hugo Fischer-Köppe as Karl Baumann
 Paul Beckers as Keppich
 Paul Henckels as Dellhausen, Wirt zum 'Silbernen Pfropfenzieher'
 Friedrich Ettel as Bürgermeister von Niedernheim
 Hubert von Meyerinck as Conny
 Ilse Stobrawa as Lene, Hamms Tochter
 Walter Steinbeck as Professor Dr. Holzheim
 Fred Immler as Fährmann Hamm

References

Bibliography

External links

1933 films
1933 comedy films
German comedy films
Films of Nazi Germany
1930s German-language films
Films directed by Herbert Selpin
Tobis Film films
German black-and-white films
Films scored by Ludwig Schmidseder
1930s German films
Films shot at Johannisthal Studios